Enypnium is a genus of flies in the family Stratiomyidae.

Species
Enypnium obscura (Bigot, 1891)
Enypnium quadripunctatum Kertész, 1914

References

Stratiomyidae
Brachycera genera
Taxa named by Kálmán Kertész
Diptera of Africa